Zhang Kexin (born 5 June 2002) is a Chinese freestyle skier. She competed in the women's halfpipe in the 2018 and 2022 Winter Olympics, placing ninth and seventh, respectively.

Career

World Cup results 

All results are sourced from the International Ski Federation.

References

2002 births
Living people
Freestyle skiers at the 2018 Winter Olympics
Freestyle skiers at the 2022 Winter Olympics
Chinese female freestyle skiers
Olympic freestyle skiers of China
Skiers from Harbin